A Debt of Honour (German:Ehrenschuld) is a 1921 German silent drama film directed by Paul L. Stein and starring Olaf Fønss, Boris Michailow and Gertrude Welcker. It premiered in Berlin on 4 August 1921 at the Marmorhaus.

Cast
 Olaf Fønss   
 Boris Michailow as Rolf, der Kranke 
 Gertrude Welcker as Tochter 
 Karl Platen as Arzt 
 Editha Seidel as die Braut 
 Willy Kaiser-Heyl as Vater Holberg 
 Waldemar Potier

References

Bibliography
 Grange, William. Cultural Chronicle of the Weimar Republic.Scarecrow Press, 2008.

External links

1921 films
Films of the Weimar Republic
German silent feature films
German drama films
Films directed by Paul L. Stein
1921 drama films
German black-and-white films
Silent drama films
1920s German films
1920s German-language films